Angelo Jurkas  is a writer, film director, publicist, novelist, essayist, lyricist and screenwriter.

Biography 

Jurkas was born in Koprivnica, Croatia. Grew up and brought up in the city of Đurđevac. He was educated in the city of Zagreb

He has LL.M. (Master of Laws); Faculty of Law of the University of Zagreb and Master of Primary education; Faculty of Teacher Education of the University of Zagreb.

Regarding literature work he has published six solo literary publications; "Bez Rocka Trajanja/No Time Limits" (Znanje, 2010), "Soundtrack života/Soundtrack of Life" (Znanje, 2011), "Volim te/I Love You" (Produkcija, 2012), "Off The Record – stories from the brighter side" (DOP Produkcija 2012), "Veliki prasak: službena biografija 2 Cellos/A Big Bang: Official Biography by 2 Cellos” (Menart 2013), "Raspelo/The Crucifix" (DOP Produkcija, 2014.).,.

Also, he started a solo music career together with producer Hrvoje Marjanović Sett and he has recorded and published so far two solo albums "Soundtrack for Life" and "Off The Record"., 

Since 2000 to 2013 he has worked as a journalist/editor in all types of media; ranging from radio stations, foreign and domestic press (e.g. HTV, Večernji list, Heroina Nova, Ritam, Pitchfork, Teen generacija, Klik, Vip.hr, Net.hr)., 

In 2003 he founded the marketing and promotion company DOP Production/DOP Produkcija,. an independent firm consisting of:
discograph label DOP Records (Ramirez, Svadbas, Lollobrigida, Dječaci, Quasarr, Pink Studio, Viva Glorio, Batida)
booking and concert agency A1 Booking Agency (Rokaj fest 2008, Terraneo 2011 – The Fall, La Roux, Raveonettes), Mudhoney, Wedding Present, Future of the Left, The Fall, These New Puritans, Datsuns, Dwarves, Wire, Lemonheads, New Bomb Turks, Nashville Pussy, E Z Rollers, Dub Syndicate, Guitar Wolf, Cedell Davis and many others
department specialized for video production – DOP Art

He also initiated and organised the national music award Zlatna Koogla/Golden Bowl that lasted from 2003 to 2010 in which he had gathered more the one hundred national and regional artists and bands to play during the manifestation.

Books 
His first published book was called "Bez Roka Trajanja/Without Time Limits“ and is a portrait of the Balkan region through the perspective of 200 most significant albums and artists of this territory. He was the first writer on this territory that started publishing books and audio albums (CDs, MP3s) together in one special package as the multicultural product. It became a huge regional bestseller and one of the most praised by the critics of the territory because of which he earned a nickname "Croatian Nick Hornby“. Retrieved 26 November 2012.,

The second one is also conceived as a combination of pop culture and popular self-help literature and it is called "Soundtrack of Life; self help with music“ – the selection of the 365 most relevant albums and artists as the perfect music for each and every day of the year.

Music album by the same name is meant to be soundtrack of the day. The album is made of 24 songs, each for every hour of the day and among numerous national and international guest stars there is also the guest participation of the Croatian President, Ivo Josipovic, who is Jurkas' former professor on the Faculty of Law in Zagreb.

Third book was poetry collection "I Love You“, autobiographical story composed of love songs and beatnic street poetry., Retrieved 24 February 2011.

Fourth one was the book and the album named "Off The Record – stories from the brighter side“ detailing the collection of numerous accidents, funny events, short stories from the concerts, promotions and similar stuff regarding more than 300 most interesting bands from world rock scene from The Rolling Stones, Bruce Springsteen, Iggy Pop, Ramones, Rage Against The Machine, Guns And Roses, Metallica, Nirvana, Beastie Boys, Nick Cave, indie scene The Jesus Lizard, Jon Spencer Blues Explosion, Henry Rollins, Gang of Four, Godfathers, Fugazi, Shellac and the others such as Macy Gray, Sade, 50 Cent, Beyoncé, and many more.

Fifth solo title is "Big Bang: Official Biography of 2 Cellos“, as the title says the official biography of national crossover duo, two classical backgrounded cellists Luka Šulić and Stjepan Hauser, known as 2Cellos that became one hit wonders on the global music market with the cover of Michael Jackson's hit “Smooth Criminal“ played only on two cellos., Retrieved 26 November 2013.

Sixth title is called "The Crucifix“ – collection of the interviews and the works gathered past decade writing and dealing with the pop culture in this area. Jon Spencer, Anna Calvi, Girls Against Boys, Royksopp, De La Soul, Sick of It All, Henry Rollins, Partibrejkers, Disciplina Kičme, Riblja Čorba, Thompson, Laibach, PCVC, Urban, Predin, TBF, Hladno Pivo, Edo Maajka, Damir Avdić, Krankšvester, Fil Tilen, Sara Renar, Irena Žilić, Dunja Ercegović and many more.

He started literary program Pop Up library within which Dallas Records published biographies of the artists such are Red Hot Chili Peppers, Adele, Nick Cave, The Doors and The Clash.

His work frequently touches upon music, pop culture, movies, media, etc., Retrieved 20 January 2011.

Music 
Along with independent literary career he also started his solo music works. Both of the solo albums ("Soundtrack of Life", 2011. and "Off The Record", 2012.) gained critical acclamations and were noticed as modern combination and melting pot of several music genres from rap, rock, dance, storytelling and similar music forms. He recorded fifteen videos from those two titles, all of them followed by favourable reviews. Those albums were pronounced the album of the week by RTL television and Radio 101; further positive reviews by Nova TV, Jutarnji list and other distinguished national and regional media.

Film 
Jurkas played a movie role in "Volim te/I Love You“, a feature-length film by Dalibor Matanić (2006). He also directed (along with Hladno pivo) "Knjiga zalbe/Complaints Book“, a short, special-purpose film and is responsible for numerous TV features in the TV show "Vip Music Club LP".

He acted and played in the music videos “Hirosima“ by Urban & 4 (directed by Andrej Korovljev) and “Pravo ja” by Hladno Pivo (directed by Goran Kulenovic) and few more videos., 

Together with director Goran Berovic he recorded “Vanishing” a short movie with Leona Paraminski, one of the leading Croatian actresses, based upon a storytelling music piece from the album compilation “The Crucifix”.

Bibliography 
 Bez Roka Trajanja/Without Time Limits (Znanje 2010)
 Soundtrack of Life; selfhelp with the music (Znanje 2011)
 Off The Record – stories from the brighter side (DOP Produkcija, 2012)
 Big Bang: official biography of 2 Cellos (Menart, 2013)

Discography 
 Soundtrack Of Life (2011)
 Off The Record (2012)

Films 
 I Love You (Dalibor Matanic, 2006)
 Hiroshima – Urban & 4 (Andrej Korovljev, 2009)
 Pravo ja – Hladno Pivo (Goran Kulenovic, 2013)
 Nestajanje / Vanishing (Goran Berović, 2013)
 Zbog tebe (Because of You) (Anđelo Jurkas, 2016)
 Fuck off I Love You (Anđelo Jurkas, 2017)

References

External links
 angelojurkas.com
 

Writers from Rijeka
Croatian music critics
Living people
Croatian journalists
Croatian film critics
People from Đurđevac
University of Zagreb alumni
People from Koprivnica
Year of birth missing (living people)